The Whole Theory is a 2000 album recorded by Bobby Miller. This was the third album for the singer. The songs were a departure from the organic, string-laden, guitar-wielding musical arrangements that Bobby has become known for on his previous and following album releases. The album did include a cover version of Heaven and Earth's "Guess Who's Back In Town". It was speculated that The Whole Theory was proposed to feature hip hop and film star Ice Cube. This has never been confirmed or denied.

Track listing
 Crazy (0:57)
 Stay With Him (3:47)
 Friday Night (3:48)
 Keep It Coming (Featuring Quiche) (0:55)
 I Gotta Get Paid (5:03)
 Going Crazy (3:06)
 Guess Who's Back In Town (4:00)
 Serious Thang (3:14)
 Bounce To This (3:51)
 Can You Hang (2:58)
 3 Rounds Of Love (4:55)
 Bounce To This (ol' skool mix) (4:19)
 Friday (3:07)
 Serious (3:12)

Musicians
Bobby Miller - vocals, drums, keyboards
Jerry Soto- engineer, guitars, samples
David Seape - additional keyboards
Quiche - additional vocals

2000 albums
Bobby Miller (musician) albums